Geneva Township is the name of some places in the U.S. state of Michigan:

 Geneva Township, Midland County, Michigan
 Geneva Township, Van Buren County, Michigan

See also
Geneva  Township (disambiguation)

Michigan township disambiguation pages